Olu Atorongboye (Olu Sebastian) was the sixth Olu of Warri who ruled over the Itsekiri and non Itsekiri people in the kingdom. He was the son to Olu Esigie and succeeded his father Olu Esigie as the 6th Olu of Warri. He was born Prince Eyomasan. Olu Atorongboye was the first Christian Olu to rule Warri Kingdom. He had a strong tie with the Portuguese King Philip in late 16th century, which led to him sending his son Olu Dom Domingos to study in Portugal from 1600 to 1611. He was succeeded by his son Olu Atuwatse I (Olu Dom Domingos)

References

Nigerian traditional rulers
People from Warri